Arrivano i dollari! (i. e. "The dollars are coming!") is a 1957 Italian comedy film directed by Mario Costa and starring Alberto Sordi, Nino Taranto and Isa Miranda.

Plot 
Arduino Pasti, poor left Italy and search fortune in South Africa, at his dead left a good Inheritance for own five nephews in Italy. Giuseppe Pasti and his brother Alfonso think every tricks for achieve maximum amount and for that try to make a fake good impression to widow of uncle Arduino and female notary.

Cast 

Alberto Sordi as Count Alfonso Pasti
Nino Taranto as Giuseppe Pasti
Isa Miranda as  Caterina Marchetti 
Mario Riva as Cesaretto Pasti
Riccardo Billi as Michelino Pasti
   as  Hélène Marigny
 as  Piero Pasti
Turi Pandolfini as Alfonso's Butler
  as  Lola 
 Diana Dei as  Clara 
Ignazio Balsamo as  Ernesto 
Rosita Pisano as  Rosina 
Natale Cirino as  Vincenzo

References

External links

Italian comedy films
1957 comedy films
1957 films
Films directed by Mario Costa
Italian black-and-white films
1950s Italian films
1950s Italian-language films